Magnus Norman was the defending champion of the singles event at the Heineken Open tennis tournament, held in Auckland, New Zealand, but did not compete that year.

Dominik Hrbatý won in the final 6–4, 2–6, 6–3 against Francisco Clavet.

Seeds
A champion seed is indicated in bold text while text in italics indicates the round in which that seed was eliminated.

  Franco Squillari (first round)
  Dominik Hrbatý (champion)
  Jan-Michael Gambill (quarterfinals)
  Gastón Gaudio (quarterfinals)
  Byron Black (second round)
  Marcelo Ríos (second round)
  Thomas Johansson (quarterfinals)
  Fernando Vicente (first round)

Draw

References

External links
 ITF tournament edition details
 Singles draw
 Qualifying Singles draw

2001 Heineken Open
Singles